Acanthocalyx delavayi is a small perennial plant species that grows in stony ground.  It can be found in Yunnan, China. Each rosette of leaves supports an inflorescence on which are held 10–15 light purple flowers. Its sepals and leaves are protected by spines.

References

Caprifoliaceae
Flora of China